Gyrineum bozzettii is a species of predatory sea snail, a marine gastropod mollusk in the family Cymatiidae.

Description

The length of the shell attains 51.2 mm.

Distribution
This species occurs in the Indian Ocean off Somalia.

References

External links
 Beu A.G. (1998). Résultats des Campagnes MUSORSTOM: 19. Indo-West Pacific Ranellidae, Bursidae and Personidae (Mollusca: Gastropoda), a monograph of the New Caledonian fauna and revisions of related taxa. Mémoires du Muséum National d'Histoire Naturelle. 178: 1-255

Endemic fauna of Somalia
Cymatiidae
Gastropods described in 1998